Benjamin Kamins (born  December 13, 1952) is an American bassoonist, currently active and nationally recognized as both a teacher and performer. He spent his childhood in Los Angeles, and currently resides in Houston.

He began playing bassoon at age 11, motivated by his opinion at the time that "it was the weirdest one."He attended Fairfax High School, a school notable for producing musicians such as Herb Alpert, the Red Hot Chili Peppers and the Jackson 5. At this time he began his studies with Norman Herzberg, a great bassoon pedagogue and member of the Warner Bros. Orchestra. He attended The University of Southern California for two years before winning a job as Associate Principal of the Minnesota Orchestra in Minneapolis at age 19 in 1972. In addition to playing in the orchestra, he also taught at St. Olaf College and Macalester College during this time.

After playing in the Minnesota Orchestra for 9 years, he won the audition for Principal Bassoon of the Houston Symphony in 1981, and was the bassoon professor at the University of Houston from 1981 to 1985. He has also served as guest principal bassoon for orchestras such as The Los Angeles Philharmonic, The Boston Symphony Orchestra, and the New York Philharmonic.

He has been Professor of Bassoon at Rice University since 1987, where he continues to be an advocate for young musicians and classical music performance. He is also Principal Bassoon of the Sun Valley Summer Symphony, and holds teaching positions at the Round Top Festival Institute in Texas and the Music Academy of the West in Santa Barbara, California.

References

American classical bassoonists
1952 births
Living people
USC Thornton School of Music alumni
Rice University faculty
Texas classical music